Psilopogon is a genus of Old World barbets that used to include only a single species, the fire-tufted barbet (P. pyrolophus). Results of molecular phylogenetic analyses indicate that the genus is nested within an evolutionary branch consisting of Asian barbets that were formerly placed in the genus Megalaima proposed by George Robert Gray in 1841. Since Psilopogon was proposed by Salomon Müller already in 1835, this name takes priority.

The name Psilopogon combines the Ancient Greek psilos meaning "bare" and pōgōn meaning "beard".

Taxonomy
The genus Psilopogon was introduced in 1836 by the German naturalist Salomon Müller to accommodate a single species, the fire-tufted barbet (Psilopogon pyrolophus), which is therefore the type species.

In the 19th and 20th centuries, about 19 generic names were proposed for Asian barbet species in collections of natural history museums, including Megalaima by George Robert Gray in 1849 and Mezobucco by George Ernest Shelley in 1889.
Molecular phylogenetic research of Asian barbets revealed that the Megalaima species form a clade, which also includes the fire-tufted barbet. Barbets formerly placed in Megalaima were therefore reclassified under the genus Psilopogon, which now contains the following 33 species:

As of February 2023, the list of birds maintained by Frank Gill, Pamela Rasmussen and David Donsker on behalf of the International Ornithological Committee (IOC) as well as the Clements Checklist of Birds of the World maintained by members of Cornell University both treat Psilopogon cyanotis as a subspecies of Psilopogon duvaucellii. The taxon Psilopogon cyanotis was not included in the 2013 molecular phylogenetic study by Robert Jan den Tex and Jennifer Leonard.

Phylogeny

References

 
Bird genera
Megalaimidae
Taxa named by Salomon Müller
Taxonomy articles created by Polbot